Meir HaKohen was a German rabbinical scholar of the end of the thirteenth century. He authored Hagahot Maimuniot (or Haggahot Maimuniyyot) (הגהות מיימוניות, abbreviated הגהמי"י) on Maimonides' Mishneh Torah. Giulio Bartolocci mistakenly identifies him with Meïr Ha-Kohen, a French scholar of the same century. He was a student of Meir of Rothenburg.

Works
Hagahot Maimuniot, authored by Meir HaCohen, is one of the most important sources for the halachic rulings of medieval Ashkenazi rabbis. It takes the form of a running commentary on the Mishneh Torah by Maimonides, and nowadays commonly appears at the bottom of the page in many printed editions of Mishneh Torah. There is also a section entitled Teshuvot Maimuniot which appears at the end of each book of Mishneh Torah.

References

13th-century German writers
Kohanim writers of Rabbinic literature
13th-century German rabbis
German male writers
Hebrew-language writers
Jewish non-fiction writers
Medieval Jewish writers
Exponents of Jewish law
Authors of books on Jewish law